Each species of slime mold has its own specific chemical messenger, which are collectively referred to as acrasins. These chemicals signal that many individual cells aggregate to form a single large cell or plasmodium. One of the earliest acrasins to be identified was cAMP, found in the species Dictyostelium discoideum by Brian Shaffer, which exhibits a complex swirling-pulsating spiral pattern when forming a pseudoplasmodium.

The term acrasin was descriptively named after Acrasia from Edmund Spenser's Faerie Queene, who seduced men against their will and then transformed them into beasts. Acrasia is itself a play on the Greek akrasia that describes loss of free will.

Extraction 

Brian Shaffer was the first to purify acrasin, now known to be cyclic AMP, in 1954, using methanol.  Glorin, the acrasin of P. violaceum, can be purified by inhibiting the acrasin-degrading enzyme acrasinase with alcohol, extracting with alcohol and separating with column chromatography.

Notes 

  Evidence for the formation of cell aggregates by chemotaxis in the development of the slime mold Dictyostelium discoideum - J.T.Bonner and L.J.Savage Journal of Experimental Biology Vol. 106, pp. 1, October (1947) Cell Biology
  Aggregation in cellular slime moulds: in vitro isolation of acrasin - B.M.Shaffer Nature Vol. 79, pp. 975, (1953) Cell Biology
  Identification of a pterin as the acrasin of the cellular slime mold Dictyostelium lacteum - Proceedings of the National Academy of Sciences United States Vol. 79, pp. 6270–6274, October (1982) Cell Biology
  Hunting Slime Moulds - Adele Conover, Smithsonian Magazine Online (2001)

References

Cell biology